La Démence du boxeur is a Belgian novel by François Weyergans. It was first published in 1992 and won the Prix Renaudot in the same year.

Editions 
 La Démence du boxeur, éditions Grasset, 1992, .

References

1992 Belgian novels
French-language novels